KIAA1024 is a protein that in humans is encoded by the KIAA1024 gene.

References

Further reading